
This is a list of archaeological sites on the National Register of Historic Places in Illinois.

Historic sites in the United States qualify to be listed on the National Register of Historic Places by passing one or more of four different criteria; Criterion D permits the inclusion of proven and potential archaeological sites.  More than eighty different sites in Illinois are listed under this criterion, including both Native American and European sites.  This list includes all properties in Illinois that qualify under this criterion.

Current listings

See also
National Register of Historic Places listings in Illinois

References

External links
Illinois Historic Preservation Agency, which oversees archaeology in the state

 
Native American-related lists